Arinobu (written: 有信) is a masculine Japanese given name. Notable people with the name include:

, Japanese pharmacist and businessman
, Japanese samurai

Japanese masculine given names